Harrison Biggins (born 15 March 1996) is an English professional footballer who plays as a midfielder for Doncaster Rovers.

Personal life
He is the son of former Stoke City footballer Wayne Biggins. Harrison and his parents both had COVID-19 during the COVID-19 pandemic.

Career
Born in Sheffield, Biggins played youth football with Barnsley. He moved from Stocksbridge Park Steels to Fleetwood Town in July 2017. He made his senior debut for the club on 8 November 2017, in an EFL Trophy match against Carlisle United.

On 28 August 2020, Biggins joined League Two side Barrow on a season-long loan. He was recalled by Fleetwood on 1 February 2021. At the end of the 2020–21 season, a contract extension clause was activated. On 5 May 2022 it was announced that Biggins would be released from the club at the end of his contract.

On 19 May 2022, it was announced that Biggins would sign for League Two side Doncaster Rovers on 1 July 2022.

Career statistics

References

1996 births
Living people
English footballers
Association football midfielders
Barnsley F.C. players
Stocksbridge Park Steels F.C. players
Fleetwood Town F.C. players
Barrow A.F.C. players
Doncaster Rovers F.C. players
English Football League players